Han Pil-hwa (born 21 January 1942 in Nampho, South Pyongan) is a female North Korean speed skater who competed in the 1964 Winter Olympics and in the 1972 Winter Olympics. She was the first woman to represent North Korea at the Olympics.

Speed skating
In 1964 she won the silver medal in the 3000 meter event and she became the first Winter Olympic medalist from either Koreas. In the 1500 meter competition she finished ninth and in the 500 meter contest she finished 28th.

Eight years later she finished ninth in the 3000 metres event, eleventh in the 1000 metres competition, and 13th in the 1500 metres contest.

Between 1963 and 1968 Han Pil-hwa was also a regular competitor at the World Allround Speed Skating Championships for Women. In the 1965 championships in Oulu she was most successful with fifth place in the allround event. Her best single distance result was a third place in the 3000 meters at the 1966 championships in Trondheim.

Records
Over the course of her career, Han Pil-hwa posted the following best results:

Season best performances
Over the seasons, Han Pil-hwa skated the following best results:

Politics
After her career in sports, Han has held various offices in politics and sports administration. She became the chief secretary of the Speed Skating Association February 1986. She has also been deputy director general of the Guidance Bureau for Winter Sports of the National Sports Committee, head of the Technical Guidance Office for Winter Sports of the National Sports Committee, vice-chairwoman of the Korea Ice Skating Association, and vice-chairwoman of the Athletic Technique Union.

Han is a member of the North Korean headquarter of the  since January 1991. She was elected to the country's parliament in 1998.

References
Notes

Bibliography

External links
 
 Skater business card of Pil Hwa Han on www.speedskatingnews.info

1942 births
Living people
North Korean female speed skaters
People from South Pyongan
Olympic speed skaters of North Korea
Speed skaters at the 1964 Winter Olympics
Speed skaters at the 1972 Winter Olympics
Olympic silver medalists for North Korea
Olympic medalists in speed skating
Medalists at the 1964 Winter Olympics
21st-century North Korean women politicians
21st-century North Korean politicians
Sportsperson-politicians
20th-century North Korean women politicians
20th-century North Korean politicians